Thalero is one of the oldest villages in Corinthia, Greece. It is located 2 kilometers from the Gulf of Corinth, close to the city of Xylokastro. Its original name was Tholero cause of the water but changed through years to Thalero a name has its origins in ancient Greek word “thalos” which means blooming. The village has many flowers so that's how it took his modern name. Poet Angelos Sikelianos spent his vacations there and wrote a  poem has the name of the village. From the village you have an extraordinary view of the gulf. Its population is around 200 people and the hospitality of its people is famous to all of Corinthia.

Populated places in Corinthia